KLTA-FM (98.7 FM (MHz); "Big 98.7") is a radio station based in Fargo, North Dakota, though licensed by the Federal Communications Commission (FCC) to Moorhead, Minnesota, owned by Jim Ingstad's Radio FM Media. The station carries an Adult-oriented Top 40 (CHR) format. KLTA and Rhythmic CHR-formatted HD2 translator K245BY ("96.9 Hits FM") compete against heritage Top 40 (CHR) KOYY.

Its studios are located on 7th Avenue South in Fargo, while its transmitter is located near Sabin, Minnesota.

KLTA slightly pitches up the music played on air. In theory, this will make music played on KLTA sound more "upbeat" when comparing it to other stations that don't pitch music or don't pitch to the extent of KLTA. Music pitching is still widely done throughout the radio industry, citing the same reasons stated above. Granted the topic is somewhat "controversial" in the industry as some claim it ruins the music, and no longer sounds like it was originally intended to sound like by the artist or producers.

History
The station signed on as KKIB in 1983 as the flagship station of contemporary hit radio (Top 40) formatted Superstation Double K FM network, which was also broadcast on KKWS in Wadena, Minnesota and KKVC in Valley City, North Dakota.

Lite Rock 105 (1984–2004)
In 1984, KKIB flipped to an Adult Contemporary format, changed call letters to KLTA-FM, and rebranded as "Lite Rock 105", a name and format they would keep for 20 years. Dan Michaels and Jane Alexander began doing the morning show as the station began to rise in popularity. In 2001, the morning show transitioned to "Chris, John and Jane in the Morning" with the addition of Chris Hanson and John Austin.
In 1989, KLTA-FM started the Christmas Wish Program. The station asks for donations throughout the year to their Christmas Wish Charity (mainly at their "Wishburger" event in June and the Wish-a-thon in December), and then gives out $500 gifts to families in need throughout the month of December.

FM 105.1 (2004–2013)
In the early 2000s, KLTA-FM's "Lite Rock" format was starting to turn into a Hot AC format. In January 2004, the station interspersed messages in between songs saying "January 19th, 7:20 a.m., Turn off the Lite". At that time, the station thanked Fargo-Moorhead for 20 years of listening, played a package of memories from the station from 1984 to then, and changed their name to "FM 105.1" to reflect this change. ("FM" had a dual meaning on this station, not only standing for Frequency Modulation, but also Fargo-Moorhead.) Since then, the station's focus was to be an at-work station, playing hits from the 90's and new music currently charting at the time.

Ownership changes
In May 1999, Triad Broadcasting reached a deal to acquire KLTA-FM, along with KQWB, KQWB-FM, KVOX, and KPFX, from brothers Jim and Tom Ingstad as part of a twelve-station deal valued at a reported $37.8 million.

On November 30, 2012, Triad Broadcasting signed a definitive agreement to sell all 32 of their stations to Larry Wilson's L&L Broadcasting for $21 million. Upon completion of the sale on May 1, 2013, L&L in turn sold the Fargo stations to Jim Ingstad, who had just sold his competing cluster to Midwest Communications.  A local marketing agreement was placed so Ingstad could take immediate control of the stations, and the sale became final July 2, 2013. The sale was worth $9.5 million.

The end of FM 105.1 and debut of Big 98.7
On August 9, 2013, it was announced that on August 16, sister station KQWB-FM would move to 105.1 and re-brand as "Q105.1." The final song on "FM 105.1" was "Closing Time" by Semisonic. After the song ended, KLTA-FM went silent for about 15 seconds until KQWB-FM began a simulcast on both frequencies.

At 5:00 p.m. that evening, in the middle of "In the End" by Black Veil Brides, 98.7 FM broke from the simulcast with KQWB-FM. At that point, 98.7 began identifying as KLTA-FM, effectively completing a call sign swap with KQWB-FM.

The new KLTA-FM, meanwhile, began stunting using a "Wheel of Formats", which was spun at the top of every hour, landing on formats including "Weird Al Radio", "Polka Radio", "Santa 98.7" and "TV Themes", and encouraging listeners to tune at 5 p.m. on August 19 for "something big". At that time, the station debuted a hybrid Hot AC/Top 40 (CHR) format as "Big 98.7", directly competing against heritage Top 40/CHR KOYY-FM ("Y94"). The first song as "Big" was I Gotta Feeling by The Black Eyed Peas. The following morning, Jesse and Amanda with Pike in the Morning debuted on their new home, after leaving then-sister station KVOX-FM a few weeks earlier. That same day, Cori Jensen began doing the midday shift, making her the only personality to carry over from "FM 105.1".

HD Radio

In March 2015, KLTA began broadcasting in HD, making them the second commercial station in the Fargo-Moorhead market utilizing HD Radio after sister station KBVB. A week later on March 15, 2015, KLTA launched a rhythmic CHR-formatted HD2 sub-channel, branded as "Hits 96.9" (a reference to translator K245BY (96.9 FM), operating from atop the Fargo High Rise Senior Center in downtown).

Station Staff
 Jesse & Amanda with Gordo in the morning (Weekday Mornings 5:30am-10am)
 Megan (Mon-Fri 10am-3pm, Sat 10am-2pm, Sun 12pm-6pm)
 Gordo (Mon-Fri 3pm-7pm, Sat 6am-10am)
 Jesse (Sat 2pm-7pm)
 Amanda (Sun 6am-12pm)

Former KLTA DJs
 Madi (Intern Daddy’s Girl)
 Lil’ Raspy (now at KVLY-TV)
 Alek OnThe-Radio (now at KAJA-FM)
 "Big Dog" Mike Kapel (now at WDAY)
 "Broadway" Bill Lee (while "Superstation KK-FM"; now at WCBS-FM)
 Bo Janssen (now at KEGK)
 Chole D 
 Chris Hanson (now at KBVB)
 Cori Jensen (now at KBVB)
 Harry Calahan 
 James Rabe (now at KYBA)
 Jamie Kayne
 Jane Alexander
 Jax (now at KLEN)
 Jim Daniels
 John Austin (now at KBVB)
 Kyle Matthews (now at KBVB-HD2)
 Mia
 Mike Ray
 Pike Taylor (now at WOMX-FM)
 Tim Richards
 Tony Lorino
 Scotty Matthews
 Valerie Martin

References

External links
Big 98.7 website
Go Radio Website

Radio stations in Moorhead, Minnesota
Radio stations established in 1968
1968 establishments in Minnesota